Arcubisite (Ag6CuBiS4) is a sulfosalt mineral occurring with cryolite in Greenland. It is named after its composition (ARgentum, CUprum, and BISmuth). Its IMA symbol is Acb.

References 

Mindat.org - Arcubisite
Webmineral - Arcubisite
Handbook of Mineralogy - Arcubisite
nice2have.info handmade (in German)

Silver minerals
Copper minerals
Bismuth minerals
Sulfosalt minerals